The Donchian channel is an indicator used in market trading developed by Richard Donchian. It is formed by taking the highest high and the lowest low of the last n periods. The area between the high and the low is the channel for the period chosen.

It is commonly available on most trading platforms. On a charting program, a line is marked for the high and low values visually demonstrating the channel on the markets price (or other) values.

The Donchian channel is a useful indicator for seeing the volatility of a market price. If a price is stable the Donchian channel will be relatively narrow. If the price fluctuates a lot the Donchian channel will be wider. Its primary use, however, is for providing signals for long and short positions. If a security trades above its highest n periods high, then a long is established. If it trades below its lowest n periods low, then a short is established.

Originally the n periods were based upon daily values. With today's trading platforms, the period may be of the value desired by the investor. i.e.: day, hour, minute, ticks, etc.

See also 
Bollinger bands
Financial modeling

Technical indicators